The Bronze Bell is a 1921 American silent drama film directed by James W. Horne and written by Del Andrews and Louis Stevens based upon a novel by Louis Joseph Vance. The film stars Courtenay Foote, Doris May, John Davidson, Claire Du Brey, Noble Johnson, Otto Hoffman, and Gerald Pring. The film was released on June 19, 1921, by Paramount Pictures.

A copy of The Bronze Bell is housed at the Library of Congress.

Cast
Courtenay Foote as Har Dyal Rutton / David Ambert
Doris May as Sophia Farrell
John Davidson as Salig Singh
Claire Du Brey as Nairaini
Noble Johnson as Chatterji
Otto Hoffman as La Bertouche
Gerald Pring as Captain Darrington
C. Norman Hammond as Colonel Farrell
Howard Crampton as Dogger
Fred Huntley as Maharajah

References

External links

1921 films
1920s English-language films
Silent American drama films
1921 drama films
Paramount Pictures films
Films directed by James W. Horne
American black-and-white films
American silent feature films
Films based on American novels
1920s American films